GNU Autoconf is a tool for producing configure scripts for building, installing, and packaging software on computer systems where a Bourne shell is available.

Autoconf is agnostic about the programming languages used, but it is often used for projects using C, C++, Fortran, Fortran 77, Erlang, or Objective-C.

A configure script configures a software package for installation on a particular target system.  After running a series of tests on the target system, the configure script generates header files and a makefile from templates, thus customizing the software package for the target system.  Together with Automake and Libtool, Autoconf forms the GNU Build System, which comprises several other tools, notably Autoheader.

Usage overview 

The developer specifies the desired behaviour of the configure script by writing a list of instructions in the GNU m4 language in a file called "configure.ac".  A library of pre-defined m4 macros is available to describe common configure script instructions.  Autoconf transforms the instructions in "configure.ac" into a portable configure script.
The system that will be doing the building need not have autoconf installed: autoconf is needed only to build the configure script, that is usually shipped with the software.

History 
Autoconf was begun in the summer of 1991 by David Mackenzie to support his work at the Free Software Foundation.  In the subsequent years it grew to include enhancements from a variety of authors and became the most widely used build configuration system for writing portable free or open-source software.

Approach 
Autoconf is similar to the Metaconfig package used by Perl.  The imake system formerly used by the X Window System (up to X11R6.9) is closely related, but has a different philosophy.

The Autoconf approach to portability is to test for features, not for versions. For example, the native C compiler on SunOS 4 did not support ISO C. However, it is possible for the user or administrator to have installed an ISO C-compliant compiler.  A pure version-based approach would not detect the presence of the ISO C compiler, but a feature-testing approach would be able to discover the ISO C compiler the user had installed. The rationale of this approach is to gain the following advantages:

 the configure script can get reasonable results on newer or unknown systems
 it allows administrators to customize their machines and have the configure script take advantage of the customizations
 there is no need to keep track of minute details of versions, patch numbers, etc., to figure out whether a particular feature is supported or not

Autoconf provides extensive documentation around the non-portability of many POSIX shell constructs to older shells and bugs therein. It also provides M4SH, a macro-based replacement for shell syntax.

Criticism
There is some criticism that states that Autoconf uses dated technologies, has a lot of legacy restrictions, and complicates simple scenarios unnecessarily for the author of configure.ac scripts. In particular, often cited weak points of Autoconf are:
 General complexity of used architecture, most projects use multiple repetitions.
 Generated 'configure' is written in Bourne shell and thus Makefile generation is slow.
 Some people think that 'configure' scripts generated by autoconf provide only manual-driven command-line interface without any standardization. While it is true that some developers do not respect common conventions, such conventions do exist and are widely used.
 M4 is unusual and unknown to many developers. Developers will need to learn it to extend autoconf with non-standard checks.
 Weak backward and forward compatibility requires a wrapper script.
 Autoconf-generated scripts are usually large and rather complex. Although they produce extensive logging, debugging them can still be difficult.

Due to these limitations, several projects that used GNU Build System switched to different build systems, such as CMake and SCons.

See also

 CMake – Alternative build system
 Meson Another build system
 Configure script
 GNU build system
 pkg-config – Detecting package dependencies

References

External links 

 
 GNU Autoconf macro archive
 The Goat Book homepage (aka the Autobook)
 Using Automake and Autoconf with C++
 Using C/C++ libraries with Automake and Autoconf.
 Autotoolset home page
 Autotools: A practitioner's guide to Autoconf, Automake and Libtool
 Autotools Mythbuster

Build automation
Computer configuration
Cross-platform free software
Free computer libraries
GNU Project software

de:GNU Build System#GNU Autoconf